William Jackman (20 May 1837 – 25 February 1877) was a Newfoundland sealing captain and sailing master.

Jackman was born in Renews, Newfoundland. Like his younger brother Arthur, Jackman commanded sealing vessels for Bowring Brothers. Jackman is best known for the rescue at Spotted Island off the coast of Labrador on 9 October 1867. Jackman witnessed the Sea Slipper run aground with 27 people aboard. Jackman swam back and forth to the vessel eleven times, rescuing eleven people. His crew then tied a rope around his waist and Jackman swam back sixteen more times, rescuing all aboard the doomed ship. On 18 December 1868, for his heroism, he was presented the medal and diploma of the Royal Humane Society.  Captain William Jackman Hospital in Labrador City is named for him.

References

Notes

Citations

External links

1837 births
1877 deaths
Maritime incidents in 1867
Bowring Brothers
Sealers
People from Renews-Cappahayden
Persons of National Historic Significance (Canada)
Sea captains
Newfoundland Colony people